Dellenbaugh Butte is a summit in Grand County of the U.S. state of Utah. Dellenbaugh Butte is the 2348th highest summit in the state of Utah.

Description
Dellenbaugh Butte has the name of Frederick Samuel Dellenbaugh (1853–1935), an explorer. Dellenbaugh was an artist and assistant topographer with Major John Wesley Powell's expedition when Powell camped at this location along the Green River. The butte is primarily composed of the Summerville Formation, which consists of distinctive, thin beds of shale, siltstone, and sandstone.

Climate
According to the Köppen climate classification system, it is located in a Cold semi-arid climate zone, which is defined by the coldest month having an average mean temperature below −0 °C (32 °F) and at least 50% of the total annual precipitation being received during the spring and summer. Spring and fall are the most favorable seasons to visit.

See also
 Colorado Plateau

References

External links

 Weather forecast: Dellenbaugh Butte

Colorado Plateau
Mountains of Grand County, Utah
Buttes of Utah